The 2014–15 UC Riverside Highlanders men's basketball team represented the University of California, Riverside during the 2014–15 NCAA Division I men's basketball season. The Highlanders were led by second year head coach Dennis Cutts and played their home games at the Student Recreation Center Arena as members of the Big West Conference. They finished the season 14–17, 7–9 in Big West play to finish in seventh place. They lost in the quarterfinals of the Big West tournament to UC Irvine.

Roster

Schedule and results
Source: 

|-
!colspan=9 style="background:#2D6CC0; color:#CCA61F;"| Exhibition

|-
!colspan=9 style="background:#2D6CC0; color:#CCA61F;"| Non-conference games

|-
!colspan=9 style="background:#2D6CC0; color:#CCA61F;"| Conference games

|-
!colspan=9 style="background:#2D6CC0; color:#CCA61F;"| Big West tournament

References

UC Riverside Highlanders men's basketball seasons
UC Riverside